The Boston mayoral election of 1866 saw the election of Otis Norcross.

Results

See also
List of mayors of Boston, Massachusetts

References

Mayoral elections in Boston
Boston
Boston mayoral
19th century in Boston